Lover of Sin is an American black metal/deathrock band, containing members from Christian Death (Maitri/Valor), Diet of Worms (band) member Juan "Punchy" Gonzalez, Tony Norman (live) from Monstrosity and Morbid Angel, Howard Davis (live) from Genitorturers, and guest vocals by Damond Jiniya of Savatage. The band released their self-titled debut in 2003, through Candlelight Records. It was often mistaken for a Christian Death album.

Lover of Sin released a new record in June 2012 entitled Horny Beast.  Maitri, Punchy, and Allister Pike returned for the second release.  The record featured guest performances by George Kollias, Karl Sanders, Destructhor, Elizabeth Schall, and Ralph Santolla.

References

External links
 Lover of Sin official website
 Lover of Sin official MySpace Profile

Death rock groups
American black metal musical groups